Maureen Orcutt (April 1, 1907 – January 9, 2007) was an American amateur golfer and reporter for the New York Times.

Born in New York City, Orcutt made it to the finals of the 1927 U.S. Women's Amateur but lost to Miriam Burns Horn. In 1928 and 1931 she won the tournament medal for the lowest qualifying score, and in 1932 tied for this honor. Married to John D. Crews and living in Miami, Florida, she lost in the 1936 finals to England's Pam Barton.

Orcutt won the Women's Eastern Amateur a record seven times. Her first win came in 1925 and the seventh win in 1949, 24 years later. She played on four Curtis Cup teams, winning three and tying one. She won the Canadian Women's Amateur twice and the North and South Women's Amateur at Pinehurst Resort three times in a row between 1931 and 1933. She returned to Pinehurst and won the North and South Senior Woman's Amateur in 1960, 1961 and 1962; in 2002 was named honorary chairwoman of the prestigious tournament's 100th anniversary.

Orcutt won the New York Metropolitan Golf Association title a record 10 times. The first one in 1926, the 10th one in 1968, 42 years later. She was also named the Association's Player of the Century for the 20th century.

She was inducted into The Hall of Fame of Women's Golf in 1966.

Orcutt became a sportswriter on golfing matters in the 1920s, and eventually became only the second female sports reporter to work for The New York Times when she took over from Maribel Vinson. She finished her competitive career with over 65 tournament victories, and played the game of golf until the age of 87 when knee problems forced her to stop.

A resident of Englewood, New Jersey, she won the 1934 Democratic Party nomination for the New Jersey General Assembly to represent Bergen County.

She was inducted into the New York State Hall of Fame in 1991...to quote from the program, "Perhaps no competitor in any major sport has been a significant factor for so long in top level play". She won tournaments in seven decades.

She resided at the Carolina House assisted living facility in Durham, North Carolina, and died there, aged 99, of congestive heart failure in 2007. She was only 12 weeks away from what would have been her 100th birthday. She had previously been a resident of Haworth, New Jersey.

Significant career wins
 Women's Eastern Amateur - 1925, 1928, 1929, 1934, 1938, 1947, 1949
 North and South Women's Amateur - 1931, 1932, 1933
 Canadian Women's Amateur - 1930, 1931
 Metropolitan Women's Amateur - 1926, 1927, 1928, 1929, 1934, 1938, 1940, 1946, 1959, 1968
 U.S. Senior Women's Amateur - 1962, 1966
 North and South Women's Senior Amateur - 1960, 1961, 1962

Team appearances
Amateur
Curtis Cup (representing the United States): 1932 (winners), 1934 (winners), 1936 (tie, Cup retained), 1938 (winners)

References

External links
The New York Times obituary
USGA obituary

American female golfers
Amateur golfers
Golf writers and broadcasters
Golfers from New York (state)
Golfers from Miami
Golfers from New Jersey
Golfers from North Carolina
American women sportswriters
Sportspeople from New York City
Sportspeople from Miami
People from Englewood, New Jersey
People from Haworth, New Jersey
Sportspeople from Durham, North Carolina
The New York Times writers
1907 births
2007 deaths
20th-century American women
21st-century American women